Grace Episcopal Church is a historic church on U.S. 31 in Spring Hill, Tennessee.

The Carpenter Gothic church building was constructed in 1876–7 and dedicated in 1878 by Charles T. Quintard, Bishop of the Episcopal Diocese of Tennessee. Nashville architect P. J. Williamson designed the building, which was completed at a cost of $1,800. The building interior contains a small narthex, a nave that seats about 100 people, a chancel and altar, and a small sacristy. There is a single belfry with one bell that is labeled “England 1839.”

The church was added to the National Register of Historic Places in 1976.

References

External links
 Grace Episcopal Church - Spring Hill website

Episcopal churches in Tennessee
Churches on the National Register of Historic Places in Tennessee
Carpenter Gothic church buildings in Tennessee
Churches completed in 1876
19th-century Episcopal church buildings
Churches in Maury County, Tennessee
National Register of Historic Places in Maury County, Tennessee
1876 establishments in Tennessee